Cabinteely is a Dublin GAA club based in Kilbogget Park which serves the Cabinteely / Johnstown / Killiney / Cherrywood / Ballybrack / Loughlinstown areas of Dublin, Ireland.

History
Cabinteely GAA Club was founded in 1977 and shortly thereafter acquired home grounds at the newly developed Kilbogget Park, Cabinteely.
The clubhouse at Kilbogget Park was opened in 1994 by which stage the club fielded juvenile teams, 2 adult football teams as well as an adult hurling team - Kerry GAA legends Eoin 'Bomber' Liston and Ogie Moran guested for the club in the exhibition game held on the day to honour the occasion.  

In the late 1990s, the club fielded its first girls' football teams and this would later lead to the formation of Foxrock Cabinteely.

Cabinteely won two Dublin Junior Hurling Championships in the 1990s, in 1995 and in 1997. Both finals were against St Finian's (Swords).

Notable former players

Dan Connor (former English Football League, League of Ireland and international soccer player)

Conor Hoey (former Irish international cricketer)

Sinéad Goldrick (inter county Dublin LGFA footballer, multiple senior All Ireland winner (club level with Foxrock Cabinteely , inter county with Dublin LGFA) and AFLW Aussie Rules 2022 (S7) Grand Final winner with Melbourne)
Richard Boyd-Barrett (Irish politician)
Brian McGrath (former Wicklow inter county footballer and inter county Dublin Masters footballer)
Ian McKeever (mountaineer and charitable fundraiser)
Shane O'Brien (inter county hurling player, coach and Manager Dublin GAA and Westmeath GAA)
Barry Drumm (former Irish International basketballer)
Eoghan Lawlor (inter county Kerry Masters footballer)
John O'Callaghan (former inter county Dublin GAA footballer and 1995 All Ireland Football Championship winner)
Jimi Shields (musician)
Larry O'Gara (former League of Ireland soccer player with UCD)
Robbie Griffin (former League of Ireland soccer player with UCD, St Patrick's Athletic, Waterford United, and Kildare County)

References

External links
 Cabinteely on Dublingaa.ie
 Cabinteely GAA Website
 Cabinteely GAA on Facebook
 Cabinteely GAA on Twitter

Gaelic games clubs in Dún Laoghaire–Rathdown
Gaelic football clubs in Dún Laoghaire–Rathdown
Hurling clubs in Dún Laoghaire–Rathdown
1977 establishments in Ireland